(stylized as AFTERLOST) is a Japanese mobile game series. An anime television series adaptation by studio Madhouse aired from April 7 to June 23, 2019.

Characters 

 (Japanese); Mallorie Rodak (English)

 (Japanese); Jerry Jewell (English)

 (Japanese); Howard Wang (English)

 (Japanese); Macy Anne Johnson (English)

 (Japanese); Mike McFarland (English)

 (Japanese); Lydia Mackay (English)

 (Japanese); Garret Storms (English)

 (Japanese); David Wald (English)

 (Japanese); Aaron Roberts (English)

 (Japanese); Christopher Guerrero (English)

 (Japanese); Margaret McDonald (English)

 (Japanese); Greg Dulcie (English)

 (Japanese); Christopher Wehkemp (English)

Media

Game
Wright Flyer Studios and GREE launched the original mobile game in May 2014, and an update titled Shōmetsu Toshi 2 was released in November 2016. As revealed in the live broadcast held on November 13, 2018, Shōmetsu Toshi 0., the third update to the game, will be available for download on the evening of the latest music concert to be held on November 25. A new mobile game, titled Shōmetsu Toshi Drama RPG MIX, is in production, as is an unspecified 3D project powered by Unreal Engine 4.

Anime
An anime television series adaptation was announced on May 27, 2018. The series was animated by Madhouse, directed by Shigeyuki Miya, and written by Shingo Irie. Tomoyuki Shitaya designed the characters, while Satoshi Motoyama served as the series' sound director. Kenji Kawai composed the series' music, which was produced by Pony Canyon. The series aired from April 7 to June 23, 2019 on Tokyo MX, ytv, BS11, and AT-X. Mao Abe performed the series' opening theme song "Kotae". For the ending theme, Hanazawa performed a cover of "Swallowtail Butterfly ～Ai no Uta～" by Chara for the first two episodes and a cover of "Hello, Again ～Mukashi Kara Aru Basho～" by My Little Lover in episodes 8 and 12, while SPR5 performed "With Your Breath" from episodes 3–7, then episodes 9-11. The series ran for 12 episodes. The anime has been licensed by Funimation, who premiered their simuldub on April 28, 2019.

References

External links
  
 

2019 anime television series debuts
2014 video games
Anime television series based on video games
Funimation
Japan-exclusive video games
Madhouse (company)
Mobile games
Thriller anime and manga
Tokyo MX original programming
Video games developed in Japan